Editori Riuniti is an Italian publishing house based in Rome that publishes books and magazines on the history of socialism, socialist thought, physics and mathematics theory, and the history of Central and Eastern Europe and the Balkans.

History

Editori Riuniti was founded in 1953 by the merger of the Italian Communist Party's two existing publishing houses, 's Edizioni Rinascita and 's Edizioni di Cultura Sociale. Bonchio became head of the new publishing house and initiated, in its first decade, a period of expansion. Editori Riuniti began publishing its flagship magazines, which were initially edited by Bonchio and Gerratana until Bruno Munari contributed to their graphic design. The publishing house also began important partnerships with European intellectuals like Maurice Dobb, Louis Althusser, Eric Hobsbawm, and Roberto Longhi. In the 1970s, Editori Riuniti published the Opere complete di Marx e Engels and the 11-volume encyclopedia Ulisse, under the direction of Lucio Lombardo-Radice.

The publishing house entered a period of economic crisis in the 1980s that lasted until the formation of the Editori Riuniti University Press in 2007, in 2014 the company was reunified under the name of Editori Riuniti.

Publishing
Editori Riuniti published the complete works of both Karl Marx and Friedrich Engels in Italian.

References

External links
 Official website (in Italian)

Italian companies established in 1953
Publishing companies of Italy
Publishing companies established in 1953